Two steamships operated by North Shipping Ltd were named North Britain.

, torpedoed and sunk by U-707 on 5 May 1943
, managed from 1947, bought in 1948 and sold to Hong Kong in 1962.

Ship names